Chad Franscoviak is a sound engineer and producer based out of Los Angeles, California.  He is most well known for his work on John Mayer albums. The two were also roommates.

In 2003, Franscoviak helped friend David LaBruyere by engineering his album, which was released as the 2007 EP Farrago Dance Mix.

In February 2007, Franscoviak won Grammy Award for Best Pop Vocal Album at the 49th Annual Grammy Awards for the album Continuum (as the sound engineer).

In October 2007, Franscoviak won three TEC Awards.

In February 2011, Franscoviak (along with Michael H. Brauer, Joe Ferla, and Manny Marroquin) received the Grammy for Best Engineered Album, Non-Classical for his work as Recording Engineer on John Mayer's Battle Studies.

Awards

Personal life

On November 24, 2012, Franscoviak married writer Maggie McGuane, the only daughter of the late Margot Kidder. Katy Perry and John Mayer were among the performers, and Mayer deejayed the event as well. The two live in Livingston, Montana, along with McGuane's children Maisie and Charlie Kirn, from a previous relationship.

Notes

External links
Chad Franscoviak at music.com
Interview with Franscoviak at MixOnline.com

Living people
American audio engineers
Grammy Award winners
1973 births